American singer Traci Lords has released one studio album, one extended play, one compilation album, three singles, three promotional singles and four music videos. She began recording her first demo songs in 1989. After singing in the teen musical comedy Cry-Baby (1990), Lords got signed for a development deal with Capitol Records. She was then asked to sing on the song "Little Baby Nothing" from Manic Street Preachers' debut album Generation Terrorists (1992). Lords was later dropped due to disagreements between her and the label and after meeting with American DJ Rodney Bingenheimer at a birthday party, she was recommended to Jeff Jacklin, who hired her to record the song "Love Never Dies" for the 1992 film Pet Sematary Two. The producer of the soundtrack, Gary Kurfirst, signed her for a development deal with his label Radioactive Records.

Her debut single, "Control", was released in 1995. It peaked at number two on the Billboard Hot Dance Club Songs and number eighty-two on the UK Singles Chart. The song also appeared on the soundtrack to the film Mortal Kombat (1995), which was certified double platinum by the Recording Industry Association of America (RIAA). Lords' debut studio album, 1000 Fires (1995) was released shortly after. Despite the favorable reviews and good chart position of the lead single, 1000 Fires did not achieve commercial success. Its second single, "Fallen Angel" also managed to be successful in charts, peaking at eleven on the Billboard Hot Dance Club Songs and number seventy-two on UK Singles Chart. It was featured on the soundtrack to the film Virtuosity (1995).

Lords briefly returned to music in 2003 with the independent release of the song, "Walking In L.A.", and extended play, Sunshine (2004). However, she again decided to focus on her acting career. In 2010, she signed to Sea To Sun Recordings and released "Pretty" as a promotional single. Her single "Last Drag" was released in 2011 and peaked at number four on the Billboard Dance Club Songs chart.

Albums

Studio albums

Extended plays

Compilation albums

Singles

As lead artist

Promotional singles

Other charted songs

Music videos

References

External links
 
 
 
 

Discographies of American artists
Electronic music discographies
Pop music discographies
Discography